Surrounded by the fields from all the directions, is a tiny village Pahrajwas  in Jatusana block of Rewari district of Haryana. The place enjoys lush green surroundings during winter season. Mustard fields enhances the beauty of this little place during winters. Indian national bird 'Peacock' is among the few bird species found here. It has 188 households. Male Population is 407 and Female Population is 381. The first female from the village to pursue doctoral degree is Dr. Jyoti Yadav D/o Braham Prakash Yadav. Total Population is 788 It is  a village in Rewari tehsil. 123035 is its Pincode.

Adjacent villages
 Palhawas
 Rohrai
 Kulana

References 

Villages in Rewari district